Aulacoptera is a genus of moths of the family Crambidae. The original name Aulacophora is a junior homonym of the name Aulacophora Dejean, 1835, and was replaced by George Hampson in 1896.

Species
Aulacoptera fuscinervalis (Swinhoe, 1895)
Aulacoptera philippinensis Hampson, 1912

References

Pyraustinae
Crambidae genera
Taxa named by George Hampson